Dysidenin is a toxin from the sponge Lamellodysidea herbacea. It has a lethal effect on fishes and some marine organisms. It has been found to inhibit iodide transport in thyroid cells.

Since Metabolites of the sponge exhibit regional variation, it has been isolated from samples from the Great Barrier Reef, while being absent in samples from the Caroline Islands. It was first isolated in 1977.

References 

Toxins
Halogen-containing natural products
Carboxamides
2-Thiazolyl compounds
Trichloromethyl compounds
Organochlorides